Hemiplatytes is a genus of moths of the family Crambidae erected by William Barnes and Foster Hendrickson Benjamin in 1924.

Species
Hemiplatytes epia (Dyar, 1912)
Hemiplatytes parallela (Kearfott, 1908)
Hemiplatytes prosenes (Dyar, 1912)

References

Ancylolomiini
Crambidae genera